The United Left Election Committee was an electoral alliance in West Bengal, India, formed ahead of the 1957 West Bengal Legislative Assembly election. The Committee consisted of the Communist Party of India, the Revolutionary Socialist Party, the Praja Socialist Party, the All India Forward Bloc and the Marxist Forward Bloc. The formation of the electoral alliance was announced at a mass meeting at Shahid Minar in January 1957.

The front gained 33.6% of the votes in the state and 80 out of 196 seats in Assembly.

References

1957 establishments in West Bengal
Defunct political parties in West Bengal
Defunct political party alliances in India
Political parties established in 1957
Political parties with year of disestablishment missing